Yema cake is a Filipino chiffon cake with a custard filling known as yema. It is generally prepared identically to mamón (chiffon cakes and sponge cakes in Filipino cuisine), with the only difference being that it incorporates yema either as frosting, as filling, or as part of the cake batter. Yema is a custard-like combination of milk and egg yolks. It is also typically garnished with grated cheese.

See also
Pastel de Camiguin
 Flan cake
Brazo de Mercedes
Ube cake
Crema de fruta
Mango float
 List of cakes

References

Philippine desserts
Cakes